William Patrick McGuire (born February 14, 1964) is an American former professional baseball catcher for the Seattle Mariners of the Major League Baseball (MLB).

McGuire attended Creighton Preparatory School in Omaha where he was regarded as one of the best high school catchers in the country. He was named to the ABCA/Rawlings High School All-America Baseball Team in both 1981 and 1982. He committed to playing college baseball at Nebraska over competing offers from Arizona, Arizona State, USC, Miami and Mississippi State among others. Although selected by the Cleveland Indians in the 25th round of the 1982 Major League Baseball draft, he chose to honor his commitment and enroll at Nebraska.

McGuire thrived at Nebraska as both a catcher and a pitcher. He received Second and Third Team All-America honors from Baseball America as a sophomore and junior respectively. He was also named to the All-Big Eight Conference team as a junior.

McGuire was drafted by the Seattle Mariners out of the University of Nebraska in the 1st round (27th overall) of the 1985 MLB draft. He played his final professional season in 1992 for the Single-A Peoria Chiefs in the Chicago Cubs organization.

After the end of his playing career, McGuire began working as a college baseball umpire. Through his work as an umpire, he drew the attention of Wichita State Shockers baseball recruiters to Conor Gillaspie and A. J. Ladwig among other Nebraskan baseball players.

References

External links

1964 births
Living people
American expatriate baseball players in Canada
Asheville Tourists managers
Baseball players from Nebraska
Calgary Cannons players
Chattanooga Lookouts players
Colorado Springs Sky Sox players
Major League Baseball catchers
Nebraska Cornhuskers baseball players
Peoria Chiefs players
Seattle Mariners players
Sportspeople from Omaha, Nebraska
Vermont Mariners players
Wausau Timbers players
Baseball umpires
Anchorage Glacier Pilots players